Chandrashekhar Narvekar (born 4 April 1952) is an Indian producer, writer and director, known for gritty realism, in his early dark and loud films. His most successful commercial films are Ankush, Pratighaat, Tezaab and Narsimha. Chandra also made moderately successful but critically scorned Style and its sequel Xcuse Me.

Early life
He was born in Mumbai, Maharashtra, Chandra grew up in a middle-class neighbourhood in Worli Naka.

Career
After his schooling, he started his career as a film editor at Film Centre in Tardeo, Mumbai, where his father worked. His received break in film industry came in 1971, as a clapper boy in Gulzar's Parichay (1972). Gradually moving up as film editor and assistant director.

He worked as associate director and editor in Anil Kapoor starrer Woh 7 Din (1983). Eventually, with Ankush, his directorial debut, in 1986, Chandra began his projection of the angry young man. Influenced by Gulzar's Mere Apne, he wrote, directed, produced and edited the film about four frustrated unemployed men who roam the streets of Bombay, which also starred Nana Patekar. Made at a budget of Rs 12 lakh, the film and grossed Rs 95 lakh to become surprise hit of 1986, the year when many blockbusters failed.

The following year he remade Telugu film, Pratighatana (1986) as Pratighaat (The Revenge, 1987), starring Sujata Mehta and Nana Patekar, a film on the gruesome reality of politics in India. It also brought the strong mental make-up of the Indian woman to the thoughts of the Indian youth. In 1988 he made Tezaab, the film that effectively launched Madhuri Dixit's career. It was the beginning of the Bollywood diva's long and successful pairing with Anil Kapoor, and her mastery of dancing through the song Ek Do Teen.  With Tezaab, N Chandra scored a box office hat-trick at his previous hits,  Ankush (1986) and Pratighaat (1987).

In early 2014, reports of a sequel of hit film Tezaab with a new cast made news.

Filmography

References

External links

1952 births
Living people
Hindi-language film directors
Film directors from Mumbai
20th-century Indian film directors
Indian male screenwriters
Hindi film producers
21st-century Indian film directors
Film producers from Mumbai
Hindi screenwriters
20th-century Indian dramatists and playwrights
21st-century Indian dramatists and playwrights
People from Bandra
Screenwriters from Maharashtra
20th-century Indian male writers
21st-century Indian male writers